Sir William George Cusins (14 October 183331 August 1893) was an English pianist, violinist, organist, conductor and composer.

Biography
Born in London, Cusins entered the Chapel Royal in his tenth year and studied music in Brussels under François-Joseph Fétis and later at the Royal Academy of Music (RAM) in London, under Cipriani Potter, William Sterndale Bennett, Charles Lucas and Prosper Sainton. 

He toured widely, in England, Leipzig, Berlin and other places, as a concert pianist and as a composer.  He was appointed organist to Queen Victoria's private chapel.  He also played the violin in various orchestras in London.  In 1851 he became assistant professor at the RAM, and later full professor.  In 1867 he succeeded Sterndale Bennett as conductor of the Philharmonic Society and remained in this post until 1883.

He was appointed Master of the Queen's Musick by Queen Victoria in 1870, succeeding George Frederick Anderson, who had retired.  He was knighted on 5 August 1892 (the only Master to be knighted during his term of office) and received the Cross of Isabella the Catholic in 1893. 

He died at Remonchamps, Ardennes, France on 31 August 1893, of influenza, and was buried at Kensal Green, London.

Works
Sir William Cusins produced editions of the piano music of Robert Schumann. Among his works as a composer are Royal Wedding Serenata (1863), concert overture Les Travailleurs de la mer (1869), the oratorio Gideon (produced Gloucester, 1871), overture to William Shakespeare's Love's Labour's Lost (1875), Piano Concerto in A minor, marches and songs.

References

Sources

External links
 The collected compositions of His Royal Highness the Prince Consort. edited by Cusins; from Sibley Music Library Digital Scores Collection

English classical pianists
Male classical pianists
English composers
English conductors (music)
British male conductors (music)
Royal Philharmonic Society Gold Medallists
Alumni of the Royal Academy of Music
Musicians from London
1833 births
1893 deaths
Masters of the Queen's Music
Composers awarded knighthoods
Conductors (music) awarded knighthoods
Knights Bachelor
Musicians awarded knighthoods
Artists' Rifles soldiers
Deaths from influenza
Burials at Kensal Green Cemetery
19th-century British composers
19th-century conductors (music)
19th-century classical pianists
19th-century English musicians